Brigitte Kaandorp (born 10 March 1962 in Haarlem) is a Dutch comedian and singer-songwriter. She started her show business career in 1983. Kaandorp's style is a mix of absurdism and sensitive songs, sometimes playing the ukulele. Many of her shows have been broadcast on Dutch TV. She also performed in Belgium.

Theater performances 
 1982: Brigitte Kaandorp 1 
 1987: Waar gaat zij helemaal alleen heen
 1988: Laat mij maar even 
 1990: Kouwe drukte 
 1990: Brigitte Kaandorp 2 
 1992: Kunst 
 1995: Chez Marcanti Plaza 
 1997: ... En vliegwerk
 1998: Miss Kaandorp, Brigitte de musical, CD opname
 2000: Badwater
 2003: Lustrum
 2004-2006: 1000 & 1 dag
 2007-2009: Zó
 2011-2012: Cabaret voor beginners 
 2013: De Bonbonnière
 2013: De Waddenzeetournee
 2014-2015: Grande de Luxe (Extra Plus)
 2016: Metropole volgens Kaandorp
 2018: Wereldtournee
 2018-2020: Eh...

References (in Dutch)

1962 births
Living people
People from Haarlem
Dutch women comedians
Dutch women singer-songwriters
20th-century Dutch women singers
21st-century Dutch women singers
21st-century Dutch singers